War & Peace Volume 1 (The War Disc) is the fifth studio album by American rapper Ice Cube. It was released on November 17, 1998, through Lench Mob Records and Priority Records. The album features production by Bud'da, E-A-Ski, Ice Cube, K-Mac, N.O. Joe and T-Mix. It is the first part from the two-album project War & Peace, the subsequent volume, War & Peace Vol. 2 (The Peace Disc) was released in 2000.

This album was Cube's first album in five years since his last album, Lethal Injection, while he was working on other projects. The album received generally mixed reviews and debuted at number seven on the US Billboard 200 chart, selling 180,000 copies in the first week.

Content
It moves from intense street-oriented jams to rap-metal fusions, such as the Korn featured song "Fuck Dying", to social commentary such as "Ghetto Vet."

Commercial performance
War & Peace Vol. 1 (The War Disc) debuted at number seven on the US Billboard 200 chart, selling 180,000 copies in the first week. This became Ice Cube's fourth US top-ten album. On January 25, 1999, the album was certified platinum by the Recording Industry Association of America (RIAA) for sales of over a million copies in the United States.

Track listing

Charts

Weekly charts

Year-end charts

Certifications

References

External links 
 War & Peace Vol. 1 (The War Disc) at Discogs

Ice Cube albums
1998 albums
Albums produced by Bud'da
Albums produced by E-A-Ski
Albums produced by N.O. Joe
Priority Records albums